The Deputy Prime Minister of Tonga is the principal deputy of the Prime Minister of Tonga. The office is currently vacant.

List of officeholders 
 Havea Tui'ha'ateiho (1953–1960)
 Langi Kavaliku (22 August 1991 – 2000)
 Tevita Poasi Tupou (2000 – ?)
 Viliami Tangi (May 2006 – 4 January 2011)
 Samiu Vaipulu (5 January 2011 – 30 December 2014)
 Siaosi Sovaleni (30 December 2014 – 6 September 2017)
 Sione Vuna Fa'otusia (10 October 2019 – 14 December 2020)
 Maʻafu Tukuiʻaulahi (16 December 2020 – 12 December 2021)
 Poasi Tei (28 December 2021 – 10 August 2022)

References

See also 
 Politics of Tonga

Politics of Tonga
Government of Tonga
Tonga, Deputy Prime Minister of
 
Deputy Prime Minister
1953 establishments in Tonga